Eucosma ephedrana is a species of moth of the family Tortricidae. It is found in Transcaucasia, Central Asia, Iran and Afghanistan.

References

Moths described in 1877
Eucosmini